The Bram Stoker Award for Best Young Adult Novel is an award presented by the Horror Writers Association (HWA) for "superior achievement" in horror writing for young adult novels.

Winners and nominees

References

External links
 Stoker Award on the HWA web page
 Graphical listing of all Bram Stoker award winners and nominees

 
Young Adult Novel
English-language literary awards
Awards established in 2011
2011 establishments in the United States